Eileen Yeow (born 4 January 1972), also known as Yiu Ying-ying, is a Hong Kong-based Singaporean actress and was named as one of the Five Fresh Beauties of TVB in 1995.

Career
Yeow won the title of Miss Singapore Universe in 1991. After that, she went on to represent Singapore in the Miss Universe pageant in Las Vegas during the same year. Her best friend, Anita Yuen, then encouraged her to expand her acting career in Hong Kong. She then went to Hong Kong and became an actress. In 2013 she appeared in the film Blind Detective which was featured at the Cannes Film Festival.

Personal life 
Yeow was born in Singapore.

In June 2011, she gave birth to a boy, Evan, with her boyfriend of 8 years. She said she didn't plan to get married and would deal with love life in a low-key manner.

Filmography

TV series

References

External links
 

1972 births
Living people
Miss Universe 1991 contestants
Singaporean actresses
Singaporean beauty pageant winners
Singaporean emigrants to Hong Kong
Singaporean people of Teochew descent
TVB actors
Singaporean born Hong Kong artists